The orlop is the lowest deck in a ship (except for very old ships). It is the deck or part of a deck where the cables are stowed, usually below the water line. 

According to the Oxford English Dictionary, the word descends from Dutch overloop from the verb overlopen, "to run (over); extend".

References

Sailing ship components
Shipbuilding
Ship compartments